Mears Fork is a  long third order tributary to the Haw River, in Guilford County, North Carolina.

Variant names
According to the Geographic Names Information System, it has also been known historically as:  
Mears Fork Creek

Course
Mears Fork rises on the divide between Mears Fork, Haw River, and Reedy Fork at Summerfield in Guilford County.  Mears Fork then flows northeast to meet the Haw River about 2 miles south of Midway, North Carolina.

Watershed
Mears Fork drains  of area, receives about 45.7 in/year of precipitation, has a topographic wetness index of 409.05 and is about 50% forested.

Natural History
The Natural Areas Inventory Guilford County, North Carolina and a later addition in 1995 recognized nine locations of natural significance in the Mears Fork watershed.  These sites include:

 Witty Road Wetland (County General Significant)--the location of semi-impermanent impoundment and alluvial forest.
 Cummings Dairy Beaver Pond (County General Significant)--the location of a shrub swamp from an old beaver pond.
 Strader Road Beaver Pond (County General Significant)--the location of a beaver pond.
 Trailing Cedar Farm (County High Significant)--the location of wetland and forested communities with rare species.
 Burnt Oaks (County General Significant)--the location of beaver pond wetlands and forested slopes.
 Mears Fork at Lake Brandt Road (County High Significant)--the location of a mature Dry-Mesic Oak-Hickory Forest and Mesic Mixed Hardwood Forest.
 Cedar Hollow Alluvial Forest (County Low Significant)--the location of Piedmont Alluvial Forest.
 Mear Fork at Church Street (County General Significant)--the location of mature Dry-Mesic Oak-Hickory Forest.
 Church Street Ginseng Slope (County General Significant)--the location of a mature Mesic Mixed Hardwood Forest.

See also
List of rivers of North Carolina

References

External links
 Article about Open Space preservation along Mears Fork

Rivers of North Carolina
Rivers of Guilford County, North Carolina